Dayton Lane Historic District is a registered historic district in Hamilton, Ohio, listed in the National Register on 1983-06-30.  It contains 209 contributing buildings.

Historic uses 
Single Dwelling
Multiple Dwelling
Religious Structure
Manufacturing Facility

Notes 

Historic districts on the National Register of Historic Places in Ohio
Historic districts in Butler County, Ohio
National Register of Historic Places in Butler County, Ohio
Hamilton, Ohio